The Nor-'westers : Stories and Sketches of Life in Australia's "Out Back" is a 1954 book by Ion Idriess.

It consists of a series of sketches by Idriess about the north west of Australia, much of it autobiographical.

References

External links
The Nor'westers at AustLit

1954 non-fiction books
Books by Ion Idriess
Australian non-fiction books
Angus & Robertson books